Lee Hak-Rae (born 1938) is a retired South Korean judoka and sport official best known for taking the Judge's Oath at the 1988 Summer Olympics in Seoul.

References
IOC 1988 Summer Olympics
Wendl, Karel. "The Olympic Oath - A Brief History" Citius, Altius, Fortius (Journal of Olympic History since 1997). Winter 1995. pp. 4,5.

Living people
South Korean male judoka
South Korean referees and umpires
1938 births
Olympic officials
Oath takers at the Olympic Games